Lotta Fountain is a 1939 fountain and sculpture by artist Katharine Lane Weems and architects J. W. Ames and E. S. Dodge. It is installed along Boston's Charles River Esplanade in the U.S. state of Massachusetts.

Description and history
The granite structure is approximately 10 x 20 x 15 ft. and functions as a drinking fountain. It features a square column topped with seated dog, and a spout on the base depicting the head of a cat. The work was surveyed as part of the Smithsonian Institution's "Save Outdoor Sculpture!" program in 1997.

See also

 1939 in art

References

External links
 

1939 establishments in Massachusetts
1939 sculptures
Animal sculptures in Massachusetts
Cats in art
Charles River Esplanade
Drinking fountains in the United States
Fountains in Massachusetts
Granite sculptures in Massachusetts
Outdoor sculptures in Boston
Sculptures of dogs in the United States
Statues in Boston